Madam Secretary: A Memoir is the autobiography of United States Secretary of State Madeleine Albright, published in 2003.  It covers both her life and the eight years she spent in the Clinton administration, first as United States Ambassador to the United Nations and then as head of the State Department.  The book's title reflects the term of address for a female governmental secretary.  Madam Secretary appeared on The New York Times Best Seller list.

External links
 Official book website
 Full text at Internet Archive
 Interview with Albright on Madam Secretary, September 19, 2003, C-SPAN
 Presentation by Albright on Madam Secretary, November 8, 2003, C-SPAN
 Presentation by Albright on Madam Secretary, April 5, 2005, C-SPAN

2003 non-fiction books
American autobiographies
Books about the Clinton administration
Books by Madeleine Albright
Political autobiographies